The 1953–54 DDR-Oberliga season was the sixth season of the DDR-Oberliga, the top level of ice hockey in East Germany. Six teams participated in the league, and SG Dynamo Weißwasser won the championship.

Regular season

References

External links
East German results 1949-1970

East
DDR-Oberliga (ice hockey) seasons
1953 in East German sport
1954 in East German sport
Ger